Michael Joseph "Doc" Kennedy (August 11, 1853 – May 23, 1920) was an American professional baseball player. He played catcher in the major leagues from 1879 to 1883.

External links

1853 births
1920 deaths
19th-century baseball players
Baseball players from New York (state)
Major League Baseball catchers
Cleveland Blues (NL) players
Buffalo Bisons (NL) players
Memphis Reds (League Alliance) players
Rochester (minor league baseball) players
Cleveland Forest Cities players
Hamilton Clippers players
Elmira Colonels players
Rochester Flour Cities players
Rochester Maroons players
Rochester Jingoes players
Canandaigua (minor league baseball) players
Albany Senators players
Elmira Gladiators players
Buffalo Bisons (minor league) players
Worcester (minor league baseball) players
Fall River Indians players
Johnstown Mormans players
Palmyra Mormans players
Sportspeople from Brooklyn
Baseball players from New York City